Aldunate is a surname. Notable people with the surname include:

Arturo Aldunate Phillips (1902–1985), Chilean poet
Carlos Aldunate Solar (1856–1931), Chilean politician 
Carlos Aldunate Lyon (1916–2018), Chilean Catholic Jesuit priest
Elena Aldunate (1925–2005), Chilean journalist and writer
Fernando Errázuriz Aldunate (1777–1841), Chilean politician
José Aldunate (1917–2019), Chilean Jesuit priest and human rights activist
José Antonio Martínez de Aldunate (1731–1811), Chilean bishop and politician
Luis Aldunate (1842–1908), Chilean lawyer and politician
Raúl Aldunate Phillips (1906-1979), Chilean writer, politician, and soldier
Wilson Ferreira Aldunate (1919–1988), Uruguayan politician

See also
Urraúl Bajo